Ahl Fashshash is a village in south-western Yemen. It is located in the Abyan Governorate. Its nearest airport is Aden International Airport.

External links
Towns and villages in the Abyan Governorate

Populated places in Abyan Governorate
Villages in Yemen